Gainsbourg: A Heroic Life (original title: Gainsbourg (Vie héroïque)) is a 2010 French drama film written and directed by Joann Sfar. It is a biopic of French singer Serge Gainsbourg.

Plot
The film follows notorious musician Serge Gainsbourg's exploits from his upbringing in Nazi occupied France through his rise to fame and love affairs with Juliette Gréco, Brigitte Bardot and Jane Birkin to his later experimentation with reggae in Jamaica. It also incorporates multiple elements of fantasy, most significantly with the character called "The Mug", an animated exaggeration of Gainsbourg that acts as his conscience (or anti-conscience) at crucial moments in Gainsbourg's life. The film also includes many of Gainsbourg's more famous songs, which serve as the soundtrack to the film and often serve as plot elements themselves.

Cast

Notes
Lucy Gordon committed suicide while the film was in post-production, and it is dedicated to her.

Critical response
The film received mixed to positive reviews. Review aggregator Rotten Tomatoes reports that 73% of 78 critics gave the film a positive review, for an average rating of 6.2/10. The site's consensus reads, "It might be thinly written and messily made, but Gainsbourg: A Heroic Life is also appropriately glamorous and intense -- and powerfully led by a gripping performance from Erik Elmosnino.". Metacritic gave the film a score of 58 out of 100, based on 26 critics, indicating "mixed or average reviews".

Kenneth Turan of The Los Angeles Times enjoyed the film:

Other critics had alternative opinions, such as A.O. Scott of The New York Times:

Accolades
The film was awarded 3 César Awards on 25 February 2011 including a César Award for Best Actor for Eric Elmosnino, a César Award for Best First Feature Film for Joann Sfar and César Award for Best Sound. It also received an additional 8 nominations.

References

External links
 
 

2010 films
2010s French-language films
Biographical films about musicians
Biographical films about singers
British biographical drama films
British rock music films
French rock music films
Films about Jews and Judaism
Drama films based on actual events
Films set in the 1940s
Films set in the 1950s
Films set in the 1960s
Films set in the 1970s
Films set in the 1980s
Films set in the 1990s
Universal Pictures films
French drama films
Musical films based on actual events
Best First Feature Film César Award winners
Serge Gainsbourg
Films with live action and animation
Cultural depictions of Brigitte Bardot
Cultural depictions of rock musicians
Cultural depictions of French men
Films produced by Marc du Pontavice
Films directed by Joann Sfar
2010 biographical drama films
2010 directorial debut films
2010s British films
2010s French films